Umrao Jaan is a 1981 Indian period musical drama film directed by Muzaffar Ali and starring Rekha as the eponymous character. Based on the 1905 Urdu novel Umrao Jaan Ada, the film tells the story of a Lucknow courtesan and her rise to fame.

Plot
In the year 1840, a girl named Amiran is kidnapped from her family in Faizabad and sold to Khanum Jaan, the madam of a brothel in Lucknow who teaches young courtesans. Renamed Umrao Jaan, Amiran turns into a cultured woman trained to captivate men of wealth and taste.

Umrao catches the eye of Nawab Sultan and the two fall in love, but the relationship comes to an end when Nawab reveals he must marry in order to please his family. Umrao then becomes infatuated with bandit chieftain Faiz Ali, who woos and wins her heart. She elopes with him, but is forced to return to Lucknow after Ali is killed by local police.

Some time later, British forces lay siege to Lucknow and the residents evacuate the city. Umrao's party of refugees stops in a small village, which Umrao recognizes as Faizabad. The residents fail to recognize her, however, and ask her to dance for their pleasure.

Afterwards, she reunites with her family, who believed her to be dead. Her mother is happy to welcome Umrao back, but her brother forbids it and orders Umrao to never return. She returns to Lucknow to find the brothel looted and deserted.

Cast

 Rekha as Amiran/Umrao Jaan
 Seema Sathyu and Umme Farwa as young Amiran
 Farooq Shaikh as Nawab Sultan
 Naseeruddin Shah as Gohar Mirza
 Raj Babbar as Faiz Ali
 Ishtiaque Khan as Khan Ghilzai
 Gajanan Jagirdar as Maulvi Saheb
 Shaukat Kaifi as Khanum Jaan
 Dina Pathak as Husseini
 Prema Narayan as Bismillah Jaan
 Bharat Bhushan Bhalla as Khan Saheb
 Mukri as Parnan Aziz
 Satish Shah as Daroga Dilawar

Crew
 Art Direction: Muzaffar Ali, Bansi Chandragupta, Manzoor
 Choreography: Gopi Krishna for the song "Dil Cheez Kya Hai", Kumudini Lakhia
 Costume Design: Subhashini Ali

Release and reception
According to author Anitaa Padhye's Ten Classics (English), Umrao Jaan was released theatrically on 2 January 1981.

Rekha was praised for her acting, and she was awarded the National Award for her portrayal of the central character. But the box office returns were just average. The supporting characters were played by Naseeruddin Shah, Farooq Shaikh, Raj Babbar and Bharat Bhushan. Critics responded favourably to the carefully done historical setting.

The soundtrack was composed by Khayyam and the lyrics were penned by Shahryar. Several songs from the film, sung by Asha Bhosle, are considered classics of filmi music: "Dil Cheez Kya Hai", "Justuju Jiski Thi", "In Ankhon Ki Masti Ke", and "Yeh Kya Jagah Hai Doston". Today, Umrao Jaan is considered at par with other cult classics such as Pakeezah (1972) and is widely acclaimed as one of India's great cinematic magnum opus.

Soundtrack
The music of the film was composed by Khayyam, while the lyrics were penned by Shahryar.

Accolades

Musical
Salim–Sulaiman adapted the film into a musical play, Umrao Jaan Ada - The Musical, in 2019. The theatrical adaptation was directed by Rajeev Goswami with Pratibha Baghel in the titular role of the courtesan.

References

External links

Films featuring a Best Actress National Award-winning performance
1980s Hindi-language films
Indian epic films
1980s Urdu-language films
1981 films
Films with screenplays by Shama Zaidi
Films directed by Muzaffar Ali
Films set in Lucknow
Films based on Indian novels
Films about courtesans in India
Films shot in Lucknow
Films whose production designer won the Best Production Design National Film Award
Films adapted into plays
Urdu-language Indian films